Jeffrey Zade Rudom (July 30, 1960 – October 19, 2011) was an American professional basketball player and actor who played in films such as Revolver and District 13. He regularly appeared in Time Gentlemen Please.  He played professional basketball in Israel, where he served in the armed forces and lived for around 10 years. He was born in Bangor, Maine.

He stood 6' 5" (196 cm) and weighed 455 lb (206 kg) but dropped down to 363 lb (165 kg) after his appearance on Celebrity Fit Club in 2006

Jeff died in his home in Bangor, Maine on Wednesday, October 19, 2011, age .

Filmography

References

External links

Jeff Rudom at Willow Management

1960 births
2011 deaths
American men's basketball players
Basketball players from Maine
Male actors from Maine
Sportspeople from Bangor, Maine